Bhimrao Kesarkar is an Indian Paralympic athlete who won the silver medal in the men's javelin L6 at the 1984 Summer Paralympics, where India won 4 medals and finished 37th out of 54 participating nations.

References
 

Paralympic athletes of India
Athletes (track and field) at the 1984 Summer Paralympics
Paralympic silver medalists for India
Paralympic medalists in athletics (track and field)
Medalists at the 1984 Summer Paralympics
Indian male javelin throwers